The National Congress Party (NCP;) was a major political party that dominated domestic politics in Sudan from its foundation until the Sudanese Revolution.

After the split of the National Islamic Front (NIF), the party was divided into two parties. The Islamic Movement led by its secretary Hassan al-Turabi and the military commanded by Omar al-Bashir launched a military coup against Prime Minister Sadiq al-Mahdi and President Ahmed al-Mirghani in 1989. Omar al-Bashir, who also became president of the National Congress Party and Sudan, seized power and began institutionalising Sharia at a national level.

After a military coup in 1969, Sudanese President Gaafar Nimeiry abolished all other political parties, effectively dissolving the Islamic parties. Following political transition in 1985, Turabi reorganised the former party into the National Islamic Front (NIF), which pushed for an Islamist constitution. The NIF ultimately backed another military coup bringing to power Omar al-Bashir, who publicly endorsed the NIF’s Islamist agenda. The party structure was composed at the national level of the General Conference, the Shura Council and the Leadership Council, and the Executive Office.

The NCP was established in 1998 by key political figures in the National Islamic Front (NIF) as well as other politicians. The rule of the NCP was the longest in independent contemporary Sudanese history. It grew out of the Islamist student activism of the Muslim Brotherhood, passing through the same revolutionary salafi jihadism. The party followed the ideologies of Islamism, Pan-Arabism, and Arab nationalism.

The NCP was banned by the Sovereignty Council of Sudan in the aftermath of the military takeover on 29 November 2019. All party properties were confiscated and all party members were barred from participating in elections or holding office for ten years.

Formation of the party

With Omar al-Bashir becoming President of Sudan, the National Congress Party was established as the only legally recognised political party in the nation in 1998, with the very same ideology as its predecessors National Islamic Front (NIF) and the Revolutionary Command Council for National Salvation, which al-Bashir headed as Chairman until 1993. As the sole political party in the state, its members quickly came to dominate the entire Sudanese parliament. However, after Hassan al-Turabi, the speaker of parliament, introduced a bill to reduce the president's powers, prompting al-Bashir to dissolve parliament and declare a state of emergency, a split began to form inside the organisation. Reportedly, al-Turabi was suspended as Chairman of National Congress Party after he urged a boycott of the President's re-election campaign. Then, a splinter-faction led by al-Turabi, the Popular National Congress Party (PNC) which was renamed the Popular Congress Party (PCP) shortly afterwards, signed an agreement with Sudan People's Liberation Army (SPLA), one of the largest rebel groups in the country, which led al-Bashir to believe that they were plotting to overthrow him and the government. Al-Turabi was subsequently imprisoned in 2000 on allegations of conspiracy before being released in October 2003.

Approving South Sudanese autonomy
In 2000, following the Sudanese government approving democratic elections that were boycotted by the opposition, it merged with the Alliance of Working Peoples' Forces Party of former President Gaafar Nimeiry. This merger later disintegrated with the launch of the Sudanese Socialist Union Party. The utility of the elections was questioned due to their boycotting by the Democratic Unionist Party (DUP) and the Umma Party. At those legislative elections, in December 2000, the party won 355 out of 360 seats. At the presidential elections of the same year, its candidate Omar al-Bashir was re-elected with 86.5% of the popular vote. National Congress Party members continued to dominate the Lawyers' Union and heads of most of Sudan's agricultural and university student unions. Following the Comprehensive Peace Agreement with the SPLM in 2005, the NCP-dominated government of Sudan allowed Southern Sudan autonomy for six years, to be followed by a referendum on independence in 2011, thus ending the Second Sudanese Civil War. South Sudan voted in favour of secession.

War in Darfur
Since the outbreak of the War in Darfur in 2004 between the government of Omar al-Bashir and rebel groups such as the Sudanese Liberation Army (SLA) and the Justice and Equality Movement (JEM), the NCP has been almost universally criticised for allegedly, however not officially, supporting Arab militias such as the Janjaweed through a campaign of murder, rape and deportation against the militants as well as the local population. Because of the guerrilla warfare in the Darfur region, between 200,000 and 400,000 people have been killed, while over 2.5 million people have been displaced and the diplomatic relations between Sudan and Chad has never been worse. This has led to the International Criminal Court (ICC) indicting State Minister for Humanitarian Affairs Ahmed Haroun and alleged Muslim Janjawid militia leader Ali Mohammed Ali, also known as Ali Kushayb, in relation to the atrocities in the region. On 14 July 2008, ten criminal charges were announced against President Omar al-Bashir, and subsequently. a warrant for his arrest was issued. , al-Bashir, Haroun and Abdel Rahim Mohammed Hussein, also a member of the National Congress and indicted by the ICC, were held under detention by Sudanese authorities while the Transitional Military Council held power. Kushayb and Abdallah Banda, also indicted by the ICC, remained fugitives .

2010 election

Despite his international arrest warrant, President Omar al-Bashir remained the leader of the NCP and its candidate in the 2010 Sudanese presidential election, the first election with multiple political parties participating in ten years. His political rival was Vice-President Salva Kiir Mayardit, who was also a leader of the Sudan People's Liberation Army and subsequently became President of South Sudan.

Electoral history

Presidential elections

National Assembly elections

See also 
National Islamic Front
Sudan People's Liberation Movement
Sudanese Socialist Union

References

External links
Official National Congress Party Website
Omar Hassan Ahmad Al-Bashir Trial Watch
Omar Hassan Ahmad al-Bashir the Hague Justice Portal
"Sudanese President Threaten Wars," Sudan Inside, 18 November 2007.
"A Cautious Welcome for Sudan's New Government," by Michael Johns, Heritage Foundation Executive Memorandum #245, 28 July 1989.
Arrest Warrant for Sudan's President Bashir: Arabs Are Leaving Themselves out of the International Justice System
Sudan Electionnaire

1992 establishments in Sudan
2019 disestablishments in Sudan
Anti-Zionism in Africa
Anti-Zionist political parties
Arab nationalism in Sudan
Arab nationalist political parties
Banned Islamist parties
Conservative parties in Sudan
Defunct conservative parties
Defunct political parties in Sudan
Far-right politics in Africa
Islamic political parties in Sudan
Muslim Brotherhood
Parties of one-party systems
Political parties disestablished in 2019
Political parties established in 1992
Sufi organizations
Sunni Islamic political parties